Egor Vadimovich Beroev (born 9 October 1977) is a Russian actor of film, television and theater. He appeared in more than thirty films since 1994.

Early career
Beroev graduated from the Mikhail Shchepkin Higher Theatre College in 1998. He is an actor in The Moscow Art Theatre (MKhAT).

From 12 September to 14 November 2014, he hosted the program  Wait for Me together with Maria Shukshina.

Personal life
Beroev has been married to Russian actress Ksenia Alfyorova since November 2001. They have one child, daughter Evdokiya, who was born on 5 April 2007. Evdokiya was born in Sicily, Italy, where Egor and Kseniya own a small vacation cottage.

Beroev is a supporter of the 2022 Russian invasion of Ukraine and performed on Russian TV in support of the invasion.

Selected filmography

References

External links

1977 births
Living people
Russian male film actors
Russian male television actors
Russian male stage actors
21st-century Russian male actors
Male actors from Moscow
Russian television presenters
Ossetian people